Chiquimulilla is a town and municipality in the Santa Rosa department of Guatemala.

The town is an important regional trade location and junction. The most important products are leather goods. The town of Chiquimulilla has a population of 18,848 (2018 census).

Some descendants of the Xinca people live in the adjacent area.  This ethnicity was almost completely wiped out after the conquest of the Spaniards, mostly from infectious diseases that the Europeans brought in.  They do not belong to the Maya ethnicity. There are only a handful of elders who still know the Xinca language.

References

Municipalities of the Santa Rosa Department, Guatemala